Melrand is a commune in the Morbihan department of Brittany in north-western France. Inhabitants of Melrand are called in French Melrandais.

Population

Melrand's population peaked at 3,712 in 1921 and déclined at 1,521 in2019. This represents a 59.0% decrease in total population since the peak census figure.

Geography

Historically, the village belongs to the Vannetais. The Blavet river forms the eastern border of the commune. The Sarre river, a tributary of the Blavet river, flows through Melrand.

Neighbouring communes

Melrand is border by Bubry to the west, by Guern to the north, by Pluméliau-Bieuzy to the east and by Quistinic to the south.

Map

Breton language
In 2008, 31.4% of children in the commune attended schools taught in Breton and French for their primary education.

History

In September 1592, the Spanish mercenaries in the service of the Duke of Mercœur plundered all the neighboring parishes of Guémené, including Melrand.

See also
Communes of the Morbihan department

References

External links

 Cultural Heritage 
 Mayors of Morbihan Association 

Communes of Morbihan